Ali Ahmed (born 13 December 1994) is a Dutch cricketer. He made his first-class debut for the Netherlands against Namibia in the 2015–17 ICC Intercontinental Cup on 29 November 2017, where he scored 9 runs.

References

External links
 

1994 births
Living people
Dutch cricketers
Place of birth missing (living people)